Antonio Calebotta (30 June 1930 – 23 February 2002) was an Italian basketball player. He was part of the Italian team that finished fourth at the 1960 Summer Olympics.

References

1930 births
2002 deaths
Olympic basketball players of Italy
Basketball players at the 1960 Summer Olympics
Italian men's basketball players